Yago Cariello Ribeiro (born 27 July 1999), sometimes known as Yago Caju, is a Brazilian professional footballer who plays as a forward for Portimonense.

Professional career
Cariello is a youth product of America-RJ, before moving to the youth side of Vasco da Gama in 2018. On 8 January 2020, he transferred to Tupynambás where he began his senior career. He then moved to Europe with a stint at Condeixa in 2020–21, followed by a move to União Santarém for the 2021–22 season where he was one of the top scorers in the Liga 3. On 2 May 2022, he signed his first professional contract with the Primeira Liga side Portimonense. Cariello made his professional debut with Portimonense in a 1–0 Primeira Liga loss to Boavista on 7 August 2022.

References

External links
 

1999 births
Living people
Footballers from Rio de Janeiro (city)
Brazilian footballers
Association football forwards
Tupynambás Futebol Clube players
Portimonense S.C. players
Primeira Liga players
Campeonato de Portugal (league) players
Brazilian expatriate footballers
Brazilian expatriates in Portugal